Based on the survey conducted by the Tonga Red Cross Society and Disability Advisory Committee, there are 2,782 people with varying degrees of disability in Tonga, which makes up about 2.8% of the total population.

History
In 2007, Tonga signed the Convention on the Rights of Persons with Disabilities but have not ratified yet up to date.

Classification
In 1996, disabilities in Tonga consisted of mental disability (43.8%), intellectual disability (24.6%), physical disability (14.5%), hearing impairment (8.9%), visual impairment (5.4%) and others (2.8%).

See also
 Tonga at the Paralympics
 Demographics of Tonga

References